Alice McCoy may refer to:

 Alice McCoy (Digimon), fictional animated character
 Alice McCoy (politician), South Dakota State Representative